The 1951 Harrow West by-election, was held on 21 April 1951 when the incumbent Conservative MP Norman Bower resigned.  The seat was retained by the Conservative candidate Albert Braithwaite with a significantly increased majority and 72% of the votes cast.

References

Harrow West by-election
Harrow West,1951
Harrow West by-election
20th century in Middlesex
Harrow West,1951